Eptatretus is a large genus of hagfish.

Species
There are currently 49 recognized species in this genus:
 Eptatretus aceroi Polanco Fernández & Fernholm, 2014 (Acero's hagfish)
 Eptatretus alastairi Mincarone & Fernholm, 2010 (Alastair's hagfish)
 Eptatretus ancon H. K. Mok, Saavedra-Diaz & Acero P, 2001
 Eptatretus astrolabium Fernholm & Mincarone, 2010 (Astrolabe hagfish)
 Eptatretus atami Dean, 1904 (Brown hagfish)
 Eptatretus bischoffii A. F. Schneider, 1880 (Bischoff's hagfish)
 Eptatretus bobwisneri Fernholm, Norén, S. O. Kullander, Quattrini, Zintzen, C. D. Roberts, H. K. Mok & C. H. Kuo, 2013 (Bob Wisner's hagfish)
 Eptatretus burgeri Girard, 1855 (Inshore hagfish)
 Eptatretus caribbeaus Fernholm, 1982 (Fernholm's Caribbean hagfish)
 Eptatretus carlhubbsi C. B. McMillan & Wisner, 1984 (Giant hagfish)
 Eptatretus cheni S. C. Shen & H. J. Tao, 1975
 Eptatretus chinensis C. H. Kuo & H. K. Mok, 1994 (Taiwanese hagfish)
 Eptatretus cirrhatus J. R. Forster, 1801 (Broadgilled hagfish)
 Eptatretus cryptus C. D. Roberts & A. L. Stewart, 2015 (Cryptic hagfish) 
 Eptatretus deani Evermann & Goldsborough, 1907 (Black hagfish)
 Eptatretus fritzi Wisner & C. B. McMillan, 1990 (Guadalupe hagfish)
 Eptatretus goliath Mincarone & D. J. Stewart, 2006 (Goliath hagfish)
 Eptatretus gomoni Mincarone & Fernholm, 2010 (Gomon's hagfish)
Eptatetrus goslinei 
 Eptatretus grouseri C. B. McMillan, 1999 (Galapagos hagfish)
 Eptatretus hexatrema J. P. Müller, 1836 (Sixgill hagfish)
 Eptatretus indrambaryai Wongratana, 1983 (Bengal hagfish)
 Eptatretus laurahubbsae C. B. McMillan & Wisner, 1984 (Juan Fernandez hagfish)
 Eptatretus longipinnis Strahan, 1975 (Longfinned hagfish)
 Eptatretus luzonicus Fernholm, Norén, S. O. Kullander, Quattrini, Zintzen, C. D. Roberts, H. K. Mok & C. H. Kuo, 2013 (Luzon hagfish) 
 Eptatretus mcconnaugheyi Wisner & C. B. McMillan, 1990 (Shorthead hagfish)
 Eptatretus mccoskeri C. B. McMillan, 1999 (McMillan's hagfish)
 Eptatretus mendozai Hensley, 1985 (Mendoza's hagfish)
 Eptatretus menezesi Mincarone, 2000 (Santa Catarina hagfish)
 Eptatretus minor Fernholm & C. L. Hubbs, 1981
 Eptatretus moki C. B. McMillan & Wisner, 2004 (Mok's hagfish)
 Eptatretus multidens Fernholm & C. L. Hubbs, 1981
 Eptatretus nanii Wisner & C. B. McMillan, 1988 (Valparaiso hagfish)
 Eptatretus nelsoni C. H. Kuo, K. F. Huang & H. K. Mok, 1994 (Nelson's hagfish)
 Eptatretus octatrema Barnard, 1923 (Eightgill hagfish)
 Eptatretus okinoseanus Dean, 1904 (Sagami hagfish)
 Eptatretus poicilus Zintzen & C. D. Roberts, 2015 (Mottled hagfish) 
 Eptatretus polytrema Girard, 1855 (Fourteen-gill hagfish)
 Eptatretus profundus Barnard, 1923 (Fivegill hagfish)
 Eptatretus sheni C. H. Kuo, K. F. Huang & H. K. Mok, 1994
 Eptatretus sinus Wisner & C. B. McMillan, 1990 (Cortez hagfish)
 Eptatretus springeri Bigelow & Schroeder, 1952 (Gulf hagfish)
 Eptatretus stoutii Lockington, 1878 (Pacific hagfish)
 Eptatretus strahani C. B. McMillan & Wisner, 1984 (Strahan's hagfish)
 Eptatretus strickrotti Møller & W. J. Jones, 2007 (Strickrott's hagfish)
 Eptatretus taiwanae S. C. Shen & H. J. Tao, 1975 (Taiwan hagfish)
 Eptatretus walkeri C. B. McMillan & Wisner, 2004
 Eptatretus wayuu H. K. Mok, Saavedra-Diaz & Acero P, 2001 (Honshu hagfish)
 Eptatretus yangi Teng, 1958

References

External links

Myxinidae
Jawless fish genera